The Apple Pan is a restaurant in Los Angeles, opened in 1947, that is locally famous for its hamburgers, apple pies served with vanilla ice cream, and banana cream pie.

The restaurant, opened in 1947, is one of Los Angeles' oldest continuously operating restaurants. The Apple Pan is also notable as the basis for the popular Johnny Rockets restaurant chain. Johnny Rockets founder Ronn Teitlebaum claimed he used The Apple Pan as a model for his successful 1950s-themed franchise, copying the menu, presentation, counter seating and grilling area for the Johnny Rockets chain based on this original restaurant: a small menu with few items, hamburgers served wrapped in paper and on cardboard plates, hamburgers grilled-to-order in full view of the counter-seated customers.

The exterior of The Apple Pan was used as an establishing shot in episodes of 1990s teen soap Beverly Hills, 90210. The show's executive producer Charles Rosin wanted to use the name of The Apple Pan but instead created the fictional Peach Pit, loosely based on The Apple Pan, after he and the diner's owners could not agree on the use of the name.

See also 

 Johnny Rockets, contemporary restaurant built on The Apple Pan's model
 List of hamburger restaurants

References

Further reading

External links

1947 establishments in California
Hamburger restaurants in the United States
Restaurants established in 1947
Restaurants in Los Angeles